UPMC Events Center is an indoor arena located in the Pittsburgh suburb of Moon, Pennsylvania as a part of Robert Morris University, replacing the old Charles L. Sewall Center.  The UPMC Events Center is the new home of the Robert Morris Colonials men's and women's (NCAA) Division I basketball and women's volleyball teams. The UPMC Events Center was originally scheduled to open in January 2019. However, it later opened in May 2019 after the men's basketball team announced all of their 2018-19 games would be played at the North Athletic Complex on campus.

In 2013, a survey was conducted to see if a new sporting and athletic center would be wanted for the university and in 2016, the survey results concluded in an overwhelming favor for the construction of a new sports center.

Events
On February 4, 2019, it was announced via Twitter that the first ever concert to be held at the venue will be Evanescence headlining as part of their unnamed Spring/Summer 2019 US tour with opening act Veridia on May 12.

On February 20, it was announced that Why Don't We will play at the arena as part of their 8 Letters Tour on August 11.

On March 15, it was announced that indie-pop group AJR will play the arena in support of their Neotheater World Tour on November 22. However, the band later postponed the concert due to lead singer Jack Met's illness. The band will take the stage of the arena on January 21, 2020.

On March 18, it was announced that The Doobie Brothers will play the arena as part of a separate concert coinciding with their Supernatural Now Tour with Santana.

On March 21, it was announced that the first basketball game to be held at the arena will be played between Robert Morris and the Pittsburgh Panthers on November 12. This will be the 31st matchup between the two teams, with Pitt having won all 30 previous meetings, all of which have been held at the Petersen Events Center.

On March 22, it was announced that indie rock/folk group The Head and the Heart will play the arena on October 14 in support of their upcoming Living Mirage Tour.

On April 8, it was announced that multi-time Grammy nominated artist Sara Bareilles will play the arena on November 15 in support of her upcoming Amidst the Chaos Tour.

On September 9, it was announced that Bob Dylan will play the arena as a part of the college venue leg of the 2019 portion of his continuous Never Ending Tour on November 10.

Conan Gray will play the arena on September 22, 2022 as part of the Superache Tour.

The 1975 will play the arena on December 17, 2022 to support their upcoming album Being Funny in a Foreign Language.

Facilities
The UPMC Events Center offers a state-of-the-art freeweight and aerobic exercising rooms used for weightlifting and fitness classes.  There are also two more rooms that offer sports such as: yoga and wellness programs for students; as well as space for training recreational sports such as: basketball, volleyball and indoor soccer.  This facility is also fitted with locker rooms, private showering areas, office space and private lockers for the three (NCAA) Division I teams: men's and women's basketball and women's volleyball.

The facilities in this sports center are also used as a venue for conventions, public speakers, expos, concerts, and graduation ceremonies.

References

External links
 Official Website

Indoor arenas in the United States
Indoor arenas in Pennsylvania
Sports venues in Pennsylvania
Basketball venues in Pittsburgh
Robert Morris Colonials basketball